"Tu te reconnaîtras" ("You'll Recognize Yourself"), sung in French by French singer Anne-Marie David representing , was the winning song at the Eurovision Song Contest 1973 – the first time a country won the contest two years in succession without sharing the victory, as  in . Vicky Leandros had won the 1972 contest for Luxembourg with "Après toi" and the 1973 edition was consequently held in the Luxembourgish capital. Performed eleventh on the night – after 's Massimo Ranieri with "Chi sarà con te" and before 's Nova with "You're Summer" – it was awarded a total of 129 points, placing it first in a field of 17.

Spain's "Eres Tú" performed by Mocedades finished second and Cliff Richard's "Power to All Our Friends" third, both songs would go on to become major hit singles in 1973 – in the case of "Eres Tú" worldwide – and are today both widely considered Eurovision classics. The voting was also a very close one, Luxembourg won with 129 points, with Spain finishing only 4 points behind and the United Kingdom another 2 points after.

"Tu te reconnaîtras" is the only winning entry of Luxembourg with some level of local involvement. Although both Anne-Marie David, the composer , and the lyricist , were all French, the conductor Pierre Cao was Luxembourgish.

David recorded her winning entry in five languages; French, English ("Wonderful Dream"), German (as "Du bist da"), Spanish ("Te reconocerás") and – very unusually – in two entirely different Italian translations, entitled "Il letto del re" ("The King's Bed") and "Non si vive di paura" ("You Can't Live By Fear") respectively.

In 1973 Turkish pop singer Nilüfer Yumlu brought out a Turkish-language version of the song, entitled "Göreceksin kendini". The song had great success in Turkey. The same year, Finnish singer Katri Helena published a Finnish-language version of the song, "Nuoruus on seikkailu" ("Being Young is an Adventure"). In 1974 singer Irena Jarocka published a Polish-language version of the song, "Ty i ja – wczoraj i dziś" ("You and I – Yesterday and Today").

It was succeeded as Luxembourg's entry in the 1974 contest by "Bye Bye, I Love You", performed by Ireen Sheer.

Anne Marie David is one of the few Eurovision winners to return to the contest; in 1979 she represented her native France singing the song "Je suis l'enfant soleil" in Jerusalem and finished in third place after 's "Hallelujah" and 's "Su canción". David was also one of the artists participating in the Congratulations special in October 2005.

Charts

References

External links
 Official Eurovision Song Contest site, history by year, 1973.
 Detailed info and lyrics, The Diggiloo Thrush, "Tu te reconnaîtras".

Eurovision songs of 1973
French songs
Eurovision songs of Luxembourg
Eurovision Song Contest winning songs
1973 songs
Epic Records singles